Anaurus is a monotypic genus of Brazilian jumping spiders containing the single species, Anaurus flavimanus. It was first described by Eugène Louis Simon in 1900, and is only found in Brazil.

References

Monotypic Salticidae genera
Salticidae
Spiders of Brazil